Phanat Nikhom is a district (amphoe) in the northern part of Chonburi province, eastern Thailand.

History
Phanat Nikhom is an ancient city dating back to Dvaravati period, called Mueang Phra Rot. Archaeologists found a fortress and city walls within the district area. In the Rattanakosin era, King Nangklao, Rama III established city, called Mueang Phanat Nikhom in 1828. It was changed to be a district of Mueang Chon Buri by King Chulalongkorn , Rama V in 1904. Phanat Nikhom was divided into new five districts: Phan Thong, Nong Yai, Bo Thong, Ko Chan and Nong Irun, Nong Chak, Nong Bon Daeng sub-district in Ban Bueng.

In Mon Nang sub-district, there is a shrine to the Twelve Sisters with the rock they used as pillow when they wandered in the wilderness, as well as a Carissa carandas tree related to the legend.

Geography
Neighboring districts are (from east clockwise), Ko Chan, Bo Thong, Ban Bueng, Phan Thong of Chonburi Province, Ban Pho and Plaeng Yao of Chachoengsao province).

Administration
The district is divided into 20 sub-districts (tambons), which are further subdivided into 185 villages (mubans). The town (thesaban mueang) Phanat Nikhom covers the whole tambon Phanat Nikhom. Each of the other 19 tambons is led by a tambon administrative organization (TAO).

Missing numbers are tambon which now form Ko Chan District.

References

External links
amphoe.com

Phanat Nikhom